Pejibaye may refer to:
 Bactris gasipaes
 Pejibaye River, Costa Rica
 Pejibaye Town, Costa Rica
 Pejibaye District, Jiménez, Costa Rica
 Pejibaye District, Pérez Zeledón, Costa Rica